The Maritime Republic of Eastport (MRE), commonly known as simply Eastport, is a seaside neighborhood community and tongue-in-cheek micronation located in Annapolis, Maryland in the US. The neighborhood was first settled in 1655, and became known as Eastport in 1888, before being annexed to Annapolis in 1951. In 1998, Eastport residents declared independence as a mock secession in response to the Maryland State Highway Administration's temporary shutdown of the drawbridge connecting Eastport to the rest of Annapolis. The micronation hosts numerous fundraisers, including an annual tug of war,  run across the aforementioned bridge and annual "Burning of the Socks". The micronation is popular among tourists.

History
The neighborhood was first settled in 1655 and annexed to Annapolis in 1951.

The idea for the Maritime Republic of Eastport was conceived by a group of local residents in a pub. The micronation was declared on 25 January 1998 as a mock secession in response to the Maryland State Highway Administration's temporary shutdown of the drawbridge connecting Eastport to Annapolis. According its website; "The prime mission was to find a creative way to promote and encourage the patronage of Eastport businesses that were destined to be hurt by the Maryland State Highway Administration's shutting down for repair of the drawbridge connecting mainland Annapolis with the Eastport peninsula." The microstate's motto is "We like it this way".

By 2000, the existence of the micronation became widely-known by the other residents of Eastport, which was met with favourable approval from them. Though its independence is not recognised by any world government, Annapolis is aware of the jocular claim, and Eastport and Annapolis participate against each other in an annual tug of war.

The micronation was featured in Lonely Planet's Micronations: The Lonely Planet Guide to Home-Made Nations, published in 2006.

Notable residents
Terence Smith (journalist)

References

Further reading
Couranz, Kim (May/June 1999) "The historic maritime republic of Eastport". (ProQuest). Naval History, Vol. 13, Iss. 3.
McWilliams, Jane (1993) "History of Eastport". Eastport Historical Committee.
Dutton, Jill (22 September 2020) How To Spend An Incredible Weekend In Beautiful Annapolis. Travel Awaits.

External links
Official website

History of Annapolis, Maryland
Micronations in the United States